Over a period of 24 years (January  1957 – December 1980), Martin Gardner wrote 288 consecutive monthly "Mathematical Games" columns for Scientific American magazine. During the next  years, through June 1986, Gardner wrote 9 more columns, bringing his total to 297. During this period other authors wrote most of the columns.  In 1981, Gardner's column alternated with a new column by Douglas Hofstadter called "Metamagical Themas" (an anagram of "Mathematical Games"). The table below lists Gardner's columns.

Twelve of Gardner's columns provided the cover art for that month's magazine, indicated by "[cover]" in the table with a hyperlink to the cover.

Other articles by Gardner
Gardner wrote 5 other articles for Scientific American.  His flexagon article in December 1956 was in all but name the first article in the series of Mathematical Games columns and led directly to the series which began the following month. These five articles are listed below.

References

External links
 A Quarter Century of Recreational Mathematics, by Martin Gardner preserved at the Internet Archive
 A subject index for the fifteen books of Martin Gardner's Mathematical Games columns
 The Top 10 Martin Gardner Scientific American Articles

Columns (periodical)
Recreational mathematics
Mathematics-related lists
Mathematical Games columns